Anderson Bruford Wakeman Howe is the only studio album by the English progressive rock band Anderson Bruford Wakeman Howe, released in June 1989 on Arista Records.

Background and recording 
The project began in 1988. At that time vocalist Jon Anderson had felt artistically constrained within Yes's current format, where the songwriting of Trevor Rabin had taken the band in a commercially very successful but musically and lyrically different direction. Anderson regrouped with Steve Howe, Rick Wakeman and Bill Bruford. Bruford, who had at various times been a member of King Crimson, recruited his Crimson bandmate Tony Levin as their bassist. The group was unable to use the name Yes for legal reasons. However, the group did have Arista assign the catalog number of 90126 to the original releases of the CD and cassette. This was a subtle way of stamping this as the next Yes album after 90125 (1983).

Pre-production recording took place at La Frette Studios near Paris with Anderson putting down an outline of much of the album's songs with guitarist Milton McDonald. Anderson notably built on several demos provided by Howe, some of which Howe released on his solo album Homebrew (1996) and subsequent releases. Recording then relocated at AIR Studios on the island of Montserrat with Wakeman, Bruford and Levin. Most of the album was recorded using C-Lab's Notator software. 

Howe recorded his guitar parts separately at SARM West Studios in London. Mixing took place at Bearsville Studios in Bearsville, New York. Howe wrote in 2021 that Steve Thompson and Michael Barbiero, who supervised the mixing along with Anderson, were, while very in demand at the time, unfamiliar with the Yes sound and how the band had balanced its instruments in mixes over the years. Some songs appeared to him to have been pieced together at that stage of post-production, as writing credits did not reflect the actual input. Howe says that while "Themes", the opening track, credits him as one of the writers, he had nothing to do with it, and conversely other members share credit on compositions that were largely his.

Songs 

The final section of "Brother of Mine" draws on an unrecorded Asia track "Long Lost Brother of Mine" written by Howe and Geoff Downes.

"Birthright" concerns the British nuclear tests at Maralinga in the 1950s and 1960s in Australia and incorporates material by Howe and Max Bacon for their band Nerotrend.

"Quartet" (She Gives Me Love) contains lyrical references to several Yes songs, including "South Side of the Sky", "Long Distance Runaround", "The Gates of Delirium", "Awaken", and "Roundabout".

"Let's Pretend" was originally written by Anderson and Vangelis as a Jon and Vangelis song, but it was rearranged as a voice and guitar duet for Anderson and Howe.

Cover
The artwork was designed and illustrated by Roger Dean, known for designing several Yes covers and stage sets in the 1970s, including their logo, the last being Classic Yes (1981). Dean was asked to design the cover in February 1989, and claimed he was not briefed on its direction and proceeded to work on "whatever seems appropriate"; his main idea was to suggest what American Indian culture might have developed if European colonists had not come to the Americas. Much of the cover depicts real landscapes and formations in the US; the clay pinnacles in the foreground are in Bryce Canyon, Utah and the background hills are based on the Vermilion Cliffs by the Colorado River. The cover is formed of two titled paintings, Blue Desert on the front and Red Desert on the back.

Release 

The album was released on 20 June 1989, and reached No. 14 on the UK Album Chart and No. 30 on the US Billboard 200. Elsewhere, it reached the top 30 in Canada, Switzerland, Germany, France, Norway, and Sweden. On August 30, 1989, the album was certified gold by the Recording Industry Association of America (RIAA) for selling 500,000 copies in the US. Yes biographer Chris Welch reported the album sold approximately 750,000 copies.

"Brother of Mine" released as an edited single and peaked at No. 2 on the Billboard Mainstream Rock Tracks chart. Its music video was directed by Storm Thorgerson.

Paul Stump's 1997 History of Progressive Rock commented, "The album was calculated to appeal to diehards; sweeping orchestral bridges, episodic songs, multitudinous solos. But this, as did the 90125 project, lacks momentum, the emotional syntax of the music is still boringly rock-based; the orchestration, once pearly and luminous, sounds merely stodgy, and technology remains under-utilized; even Horn's primitive samplings of 1983 are absent here."

Reissues 
The album was re-released in a remastered limited edition by Gonzo Multimedia on 18 March 2011, with a bonus CD with extra tracks, including alternate edits and live versions of tracks on the main album, as well as "Vultures in the City" (originally titled "Vultures" and previously available only as the b-side to the "Brother of Mine" 7-inch vinyl and CD single). This edition was initially only available only from Gonzo but can now be bought from other suppliers. In 2014 Esoteric Recordings reissued the album in time for its 25th anniversary.

Track listing 
All music and lyrics by Anderson, Howe, Wakeman and Bruford. Additional writing credits are below:

Personnel 
Credits are adapted from the album's LP liner notes.

Anderson Bruford Wakeman Howe
 Jon Anderson – lead vocals, production
 Bill Bruford – Tama acoustic drums, Simmons SDX electronic drums
 Rick Wakeman – keyboards
 Steve Howe – guitars

Additional personnel
 Tony Levin – bass, Chapman stick, vocals
 Matt Clifford – keyboards, programming, orchestration, vocals
 Milton McDonald – rhythm guitar
 The Oxford Circus Singers (Deborah Anderson, Tessa Niles, Carol Kenyon, Frank Dunnery) - backing vocals
 J.M.C. Singers – Jon, Matt, Chris - backing vocals
 Emerald Isle Community Singers - backing vocals
 In Seine Singers - backing vocals

Technical personnel
 Chris Kimsey – production, engineering
 Chris Potter – engineering
 Giles Sampic – engineering at La Frette Studios
 Rupert Coulson – assistant engineering at AIR Studios, London
 George Cowen – assistant engineering
 Steve Orchard – assistant engineering at AIR Studios, Montserrat
 "Texas" Joe Hammer – percussion programming at La Frette Studios
 Chris Ranson – group tech
 Michael Barbiero – mixing
 Steve Thompson – mixing
 George Cowan – assistant mixing
 Olivier Bloch-Laine – assistant
 Bob Ludwig – mastering at Masterdisk
 Roger Dean – artwork, painting, design
 Martyn Dean – stage design consultant

Charts

Album

Singles

Brother of Mine

Order of the Universe

Certifications

References 

1989 debut albums
Albums produced by Chris Kimsey
Albums with cover art by Roger Dean (artist)
Anderson Bruford Wakeman Howe albums
Arista Records albums
Albums recorded at AIR Studios